Mohamed Lahna (born 11 March 1982) is a Moroccan paratriathlete. Lahna won bronze in the men's PT2 paratriathlon at the 2016 Paralympics.

Background 
Mohamed Lahna was born without a right femur; due to this, he was not able to compete in his first triathlon until 2008. He started as a strong swimmer and was able to swim across the Strait of Gibraltar. He went on to represent Morocco until 2016.

As of 2017, Lahna has been competing under World Triathlon after requesting a change of representation from Morocco to the United States.

Mohamed has won four gold medals to date as well as 13 podium finishes and is currently ranked fourth in the world.

Career 

Lahna won bronze in the PT2 category at the 2016 Paralympics in Rio, the first Paralympics to include triathlon events. Lahna won in 1 hour 13 minutes and 35 seconds, with a margin of 46-second from the winner, the British Andy Lewis.

Personal life

References

External links 
 

1982 births
Living people
People from Casablanca
Moroccan male triathletes
Paratriathletes of Morocco
Paralympic medalists in paratriathlon
Paralympic bronze medalists for Morocco
Paratriathletes at the 2016 Summer Paralympics
Medalists at the 2016 Summer Paralympics